Shurgol (also Romanized as Shūrgol) is a village in Benajuy-ye Shomali Rural District, in the Central District of Bonab County, East Azerbaijan Province, Iran. At the 2006 census, its population was 516, in 110 families.

References 

Populated places in Bonab County